Nobody's Perfect is a 1990 American comedy film directed by Robert Kaylor and starring Chad Lowe and Gail O'Grady.

Plot 
Steph is kicked off his college's tennis team and dresses up as a girl to join the women's team and be closer to his crush.

Cast 

Chad Lowe as Stephen/Stephanie
Gail O'Grady as  Shelly
Patrick Breen as Andy
Kim Flowers as  Jackie 
Robert Vaughn as Dr. Duncan 
Eric Bruskotter as Stanley
 Carmen More as Carla 
Todd Caldecott as Brad  
Annie Korzen as Professor Lucci
Mariann Aalda as Coach Harrison
 Marcia Karr  as Marge
 Nomi Mitty  as Mrs. Parker

References

External links 

1990 films
1990 comedy films
American comedy films
Cross-dressing in American films
Tennis films
1990s English-language films
1990s American films